Secretary to the Government of India, often abbreviated as Secretary, GoI, or simply as Secretary, is a post and a rank under the Central Staffing Scheme of the Government of India. The authority for the creation of this post solely rests with the Union Council of Ministers.

The position holder is generally a career civil servant, mostly from the Indian Administrative Service, and a government official of high seniority.

Secretary is either from All India Services (deputation; on tenure, after empanelment) or Central Civil Services (Group A; on empanelment). All promotions and appointments to this rank and post are directly made by the Appointments Committee of the Cabinet.

In the structure of the Indian government, a secretary is the administrative head of a ministry or department, and is equivalent to chief secretaries or additional chief secretaries of state governments and Vice Chief of the Army Staff, General Officers Commanding in Chief of Army Commands, and their equivalents in the Indian Armed Forces, and are listed as such on the Indian order of precedence, ranking twenty-third.

History

In mid-1930s, the Central Secretariat contained only twenty-ninesecretaries, who were all members of the Indian Civil Service. The salary for a member of this rank and post was fixed at  annum in the 1930s. As per warrant or precedence of 1905, secretaries to the Government of India was listed together with joint secretaries to the Government of India and were ranked above the rank of chief secretaries of provincial governments.

N. Gopalaswami Ayyangar had once suggested "[a] secretary should not be immersed in files and burdened with routine. It is essential that he should have time to grasp the overall picture, size up the problems facing the government in the field allotted to his charge, and think and plan ahead. All these are his proper functions and must be efficiently performed. Failure to make adequate provision in this respect cannot be compensated by a mere increase in the establishment under his control."

The Administrative Reforms Commission visualised the role of secretary, primarily as one of a "coordinator, policy guide, reviewer, and evaluator."

Powers, responsibilities and postings 

A secretary to the Government of India is the administrative head of a ministry or department and is the principal adviser to the minister-in charge on all matters of policy and administration within the ministry or department.

The role of a secretary is as follows:
 To act as the administrative head of the ministry or department. The responsibility in this regard is complete and undivided.
 To act as the chief adviser to the minister on all aspects of policy and administrative affairs.
 To represent the ministry or department before the Public Accounts Committee of the Parliament of India.

The prime minister-led Appointments Committee of the Cabinet is the final authority on posting and transfer of officers of secretary level. Secretaries report to their ministerial cabinet minister and to the prime minister.

Position
In the Indian government, secretaries are the head of the ministries of the government and hold positions such as Finance Secretary, Defence Secretary, Foreign Secretary, Home Secretary, Chairperson of the Railway Board and members of the Telecom Commission.

According to the report of the SeventhCentral Pay Commission of India, seventy-one out of ninety-one secretaries to the Government of India are from the Indian Administrative Service.

Emolument, accommodation and prequisites 

All secretaries to the Government of India are eligible for a diplomatic passport. Secretaries are allotted either type-VII or type-VIII bungalows in areas like New Moti Bagh and Lutyens' across Delhi by the Ministry of Housing and Urban Affairs' Directorate of Estates.

The salary and emolument in this rank is equivalent to chief secretaries of state governments and to Vice Chief of the Army Staff, General Officers Commanding in Chief of Army Commands, and their equivalents, in the Indian Armed Forces, which is to say Level 17 of the Central Pay Matrix.

List of current secretaries to the Government of India

Reforms 
Media articles and others have argued in favour of lateral entrants being recruited to this rank/post to infuse fresh energy and thinking into an insular, complacent and archaic bureaucracy.

Non-IAS civil services have complained to the Government of India because of lack of empanelment in the rank/post of secretary on numerous occasions.

See also 
 Federal Secretary

References

Bibliography 

 
 
 
 
 

Civil Services of India
Indian government officials
Indian Administrative Service officers
Indian Foreign Service officers